Bryce Miller (born July 26, 1982) is an American racing driver from Summit, New Jersey. He currently drives in the IMSA owned Tudor United SportsCar Championship for Paul Miller Racing. The family trio aggregates a consolidated 75 years of motor racing experience.

Early life
Born in Honolulu, Hawaii, Miller grew up watching his father, Paul Miller and uncle Kenper Miller's professional driving career from Miller saw an early success the pits. He was influenced by his father and uncle to begin his go-karting career at the age of 7. Miller saw an early success winning over 60 International Karting Federation races which included breaking the track record at his home circuit, Oakland Valley Raceway. He began racing open wheel formula cars professionally when he was 17 years old and after he graduated The University of Vermont, Porsche invited Miller to the UPS Porsche Junior Team shoot-out to compete for a factory seat, this was the point when he decided to compete in sports car racing.

Career
Miller started racing go-karts competitively at the age of 7, and by 10 years old he became the U.S. Grand National Karting Champion and East Coast Regional Karting Champion. He moved up to open-wheel formula cars, winning Rookie of the Year honors in the Formula Barber Dodge Championship and was invited to participate in the acclaimed Winfield Scholarship competition, where he finished runner-up to the scholarship winner. His open-wheel formula career spanned from 1999–2003. After Porsche invited him to compete in the Junior Cup shoot-out he decided to pursue sports car racing. In 2007, his debut year on the 13 race Grand-Am Rolex Series circuit, he accumulated 10 podiums, winning at Virginia International Raceway, winning the Team Championship and finishing 3rd in driver points and 2nd in Rookie of the Year points. In 2008, he won the Atlanta America Generac 500. Miller secured a total of 24 podium finishes from 2006 to 2009 racing in the Grand-Am Rolex Series and, American Le Mans Series and IMSA GT3 Cup Challenge. During these years he finished 2nd at the acclaimed Daytona 24 hours both in 2008 and 2011 and finished 2nd in the famed TOTAL 24 Hours of Spa.

He teamed with British driver Luke Hines in the American Le Mans Series GTC category. That season he secured a track record at the Salt Lake Grand Prix and qualified on pole at The Mosport Grand-Prix. In June 2010, Miller joined up with JMW Motorsport to compete in the 2010 24 Hours of Le Mans with co-drivers Rob Bell and Tim Sugden. In the 2011 24 Hours of Le Mans, he joined Team Felbermayr-Proton, driving a Porsche 997 GT3-RSR with co-drivers Nick Tandy and Abdulaziz Al-Faisal.

He also finished second in both the team and driver championship points of in the 2014 Tudor United SportsCar Championship in an Audi R8 LMS prepared by Paul Miller Racing. In 2014, Miller again competed in the 2015 Tudor United SportsCar Championship with Paul Miller Racing, joining both Christopher Haase and Dion Von Moltke. Miller partnered with full-season co-drivers Christopher Haase and Dion von Moltke in the Rolex 24 At Daytona and 12 Hours of Sebring, moving 2015 off to a fast start with a pair of fifth-place finishes. He more recently scored a podium, 3rd-place finish at Watkins Glen's Sahlen's Six Hours of the Glen.

Career Results

24 Hours of Le Mans results

American Le Mans Series results

Rolex Sports Car Series

Tudor United SportsCar Championship

FIA GT Championship

Blancpain GT Series

References

External links 

Personal website

1982 births
Living people
American Le Mans Series drivers
Sportspeople from Summit, New Jersey
Racing drivers from New Jersey
European Le Mans Series drivers
24 Hours of Le Mans drivers
24 Hours of Daytona drivers
Rolex Sports Car Series drivers
Blancpain Endurance Series drivers
WeatherTech SportsCar Championship drivers
24 Hours of Spa drivers
International Kart Federation drivers